Argyrotaenia ferruginea is a species of moth of the family Tortricidae. It is found in Venezuela and Colombia.

The wingspan is about 17 mm. The ground colour of the forewings is dirty pink with dark brown markings, but paler in the basal and distal part of the wing where they are tinged yellowish or grey. The hindwings are grey brown.

Etymology
The species name refers to the colouration of the forewings and is derived Latin ferrugineus (meaning rusty).

References

Moths described in 2006
ferruginea
Moths of South America